Ramin Ahmedov (born 1 June 2001) is an Azerbaijani footballer who plays as a midfielder for Zira in the Azerbaijan Premier League.

Club career
On 15 August 2021, Ahmedov made his debut in the Azerbaijan Premier League for Zira match against Qarabağ.

References

External links
 

2001 births
Living people
Association football midfielders
Azerbaijan youth international footballers
Azerbaijan under-21 international footballers
Azerbaijani footballers
Azerbaijan Premier League players
Zira FK players